Shahganj is a town and a municipal board in Jaunpur district in the Indian state of Uttar Pradesh.

Demographics
As of 2011 Indian Census, Shahganj had a total population of 26,556, of which 13,812 were males and	12,744 were females. Population within the age group of 0 to 6 years was 3,534. The total number of literates in Shahganj was 19,686	, which constituted 74.1% of the population with male literacy of 78.1% and female literacy of 69.9%. The effective literacy rate of 7+ population of Shahganj was 85.5%, of which male literacy rate was 90.0% and female literacy rate was 80.6%. The Scheduled Castes and Scheduled Tribes population was 9,584 and 2 respectively. Shahganj had 3936 households in 2011.

 India census, Shahganj had a population of 24,595. Males constitute 51% of the population and females 49%. Shahganj has an average literacy rate of 59%, Lower than the national average of 59.5%: male literacy is 61%, and female literacy is 57%.

Fairs and festivals
Shahganj is famous for its Sita Sringar Mela which is a Bangle fair. Traders from different regions of the Purvanchal come for business in this fair.

Economy
Ratna Sugar Mill, the first sugar mill of the Purvanchal  region was located in Shahganj, which is closed now (due to recurring losses).

See also
Pattinarendrapur

References

Cities and towns in Jaunpur district